Rodrigo Silva (born 2 November 1992) is a Uruguayan rugby union player. He plays as a scrum-half and a fullback for the Austin Gilgronis in Major League Rugby (MLR).

Career

He previously played for Carrasco Polo Club at the Campeonato Uruguayo de Rugby.

He has 18 caps for Uruguay, since his debut in 2012, with 3 tries scored, 15 points on aggregate. He was named in Uruguay's squad for the 2015 Rugby World Cup. He played in all the four games, without scoring.

References

External links
 

1992 births
Living people
Austin Gilgronis players
Expatriate rugby union players in the United States
Rugby union fullbacks
Rugby union scrum-halves
Rugby sevens players at the 2015 Pan American Games
Rugby union players from Montevideo
Uruguay international rugby union players
Uruguayan expatriate rugby union players
Uruguayan expatriate sportspeople in the United States
Pan American Games competitors for Uruguay
Peñarol Rugby players
Uruguayan rugby union players